Phước Long, Giồng Trôm is a rural commune (xã), of Giồng Trôm District in Bến Tre Province. It is well known for its coconut farms.

References

Populated places in Bến Tre province